The 1978 Texas gubernatorial election was held on November 7, 1978, to elect the governor of Texas. In a surprising upset, Republican Bill Clements was narrowly elected over Democrat State Attorney General John Luke Hill, winning 50% of the vote to Hill's 49%. In doing so, Clements became the first Republican to be elected governor since Reconstruction.

Besides Clements' upset victory in the gubernatorial election, Republican Senator John Tower was re-elected to a third full six-year term in the Texas U.S. Senate race. However, the majority of the down-ballot statewide offices remained with the Democratic Party. With a margin of victory of just 0.72%, this was the closest race of the 1978 Gubernatorial Cycle.

Republican Party

Candidates

Declared
 Bill Clements, businessman and former Deputy Secretary of Defense
 Ray Hutchison, attorney, former State Representative and husband of Kay Bailey Hutchison
 Clarence Thompson

Withdrew
 James M. Collins, U.S. Representative (endorsed Clements)

Results

|}

Democratic Party
Dolph Briscoe, who had first been elected in 1972 and was easily re-elected in 1974, had become increasingly unpopular within the Texas Democratic Party during his six years in office.  John Luke Hill fielded a primary challenge against the Governor, as a liberal alternative to Briscoe, who represented the more conservative, rural faction of the party.  Dissatisfaction with Briscoe prompted former Governor Preston Smith to enter the race, running as a populist alternative to the other two candidates.  Briscoe had previously defeated Smith in the 1972 primary.

Candidates

Declared
 Dolph Briscoe, incumbent Governor
 John Luke Hill, Attorney General of Texas
 Preston Smith, former Governor

Results

|}

Results

Further reading
 Bridges, Kenneth. Twilight of the Texas Democrats: The 1978 Governor’s Race (Texas A&M University Press, 2008), 219 pp. 
Cunningham, Sean P. Cowboy Conservatism: Texas and the Rise of the Modern Right. Lexington: University Press of Kentucky, 2010.

Videos
(1) Bill Clements bio 

(2) Gubernatorial Debate on October 24, 1978 at KPRC-TV Studios in Houston 

(3) Republican Primary Gubernatorial Debate in 1978 

(4) Gubernatorial Debate on October 27, 1978 at KERA-TV Studios in Dallas

References

1978
Texas
Gubernatorial
November 1978 events in the United States